Niagara Falls Transit was a public transit agency that operated the public transport bus services in Niagara Falls, Ontario, Canada.

Established in 1960, Niagara Transit originally operated ten routes. In 2007, the operation of Niagara Transit was taken over by the transportation department of the City of Niagara Falls, at which time the agency adopted its present name. A total of 14 regular service, 8 evening/weekend service, and 2 shuttle routes were operated by Niagara Falls Transit. Previously, it also operated two of the three lines of the WEGO network, which replaced the previous Falls Shuttle service.

On January 1st, 2023, Niagara Region Transit assumed the operations of Niagara Falls Transit and started providing local service to Niagara Falls along with Welland and St. Catharines in anticipation of the proposed GO Train expansion to Niagara Falls. Routes and services were largely unchanged.

The motto for Niagara Falls Transit was "The way to go".

Operations
Potential for growth of public transit is limited as most tourists come by car or tour buses. Niagara Falls Transit is very underused due to the poor route structure, infrequent route intervals. Half hour or 15 minute routes are non existent even at rush hour. There is also a lack of pedestrian friendly bus stops, no concrete padding at many stops with few bus shelters to accommodate riders. Hotels and the two casinos offer shuttle bus service around the Falls area. Taxis are also a common form of transportation in the city. Most commuters are locals who live away from the Falls area and need to get to their workplace. 

5-0 is also a carrier that provides service from the Fallsview Casino and Downtown Niagara Falls area to Niagara-on-the-Lake, using a motor coach.  Service operates year-round, but with a dramatically reduced schedule during winter months.

Niagara Falls Transit offers four shuttle bus routes, the Brock Rapid, Niagara College/Glendale Campus, Niagara College/Welland Campus, and Fort Erie to Niagara Falls.  The Brock Rapid, Niagara College and Fort Erie shuttles operate during the academic school year. These services carry a premium fare charge, but in many cases will allow you to connect to regular services offered by Niagara Falls Transit.

Chair-A-Van carries disabled passengers on Niagara Falls Transit.

Roster

 General Motors Diesel Division Buses TGH - retired
 General Motors Diesel Division Buses TDH - retired
 General Motors Diesel Division Buses T6H - retired
 Motor Coach Industries Classic - retired
 Orion Bus Industries Orion V
 Girardn step van - for Dial-A-Van
 Orion Bus Industries Orion VII - Equipped with bike racks
 ElDorado National EZ-Rider II MAX - Equipped with bike racks
 Nova Bus Nova LFS - Equipped with bike racks

Routes

Each of the numbered routes under the 100 series routes operates Monday to Saturday from 5:45 am to 7:15 pm, Evening and Sunday and holiday service is modified to the 200 series routes.  The Monday to Saturday evening service runs from 6:15 pm to midnight and Sunday and holiday service runs from 7 am to 7:30 pm with exception of WEGO Red Line

The Niagara College shuttles operate according to the academic semester (day after Labour Day until April 30 of the following year).  They will not operate when colleges and universities are not in session (May 1 until Labour Day).

Routes

(O)= Outbound (I)= Inbound

Express/Shuttle Routes

Intercity transit connections 

 GO Transit (bus service and seasonal train service to Toronto at VIA Station)
 Niagara Region Transit (various connection points to St. Catharines, Fort Erie, and Welland)
 Coach Canada (intercity service to Canada & US destinations at Niagara Falls Transit Terminal)
 Via Rail and Amtrak (rail connections to Toronto and New York City at VIA Station)

See also

 Public transport in Canada

References

Niagara Falls Transit Daytime Map 
Niagara Falls Transit Evening, Sunday and Holiday Map 
Minutes of Niagara Falls City Council October 8, 2013

External links
 Niagara Transit
 Drawings and photos of Niagara Transit buses
 Transit page on City of Niagara Falls Website

1960 establishments in Ontario
Transport in Niagara Falls, Ontario
Transit agencies in Ontario